"I Am Born to Preach the Gospel" is a gospel song recorded in 1928 by Washington Phillips (18801954; vocals and zither) in gospel blues style. His recording is included in the soundtrack of the 2009 movie My Son, My Son, What Have Ye Done?.

In some other recordings, the song is titled "I Was Born to Sing the Gospel". The words "I Am" or "I Was" are sometimes omitted from those titles.

The song is likely to have been written by Phillips: it is concerned with a similar subject to his 1927 song "Denomination Blues", and has lyrical resemblances to it, including the striking phrase "educated fool". The singer compares his own experience:

with that of educated preachers; and with that of Nicodemus, who according to the John 3:1-21 was a ruler of the Jews who visited Jesus by night to learn from Him.

Recordings and performances 
 1928Washington Phillips, 78prm single Columbia 14448-D 
 1988Marion Williams, "Born to Sing the Gospel"  on the album Born to Sing the Gospel 
 1994Aretha Franklin, "I Was Born to Sing the Gospel" broadcast performance from the White House
 1995Michael Hakanson-Stacy, "Born to Preach the Gospel"  on the album Pearls & Stones 
 2013Michael Roe, digital download

References 

Blues songs
Gospel songs
Washington Phillips songs
1928 songs
Columbia Records singles
Nicodemus